Hemicrepidius patruelis is a species of click beetle belonging to the family Elateridae.

References

External links
Image of Hemicrepidius patruelis on BugGuide

Beetles described in 1896
patruelis